The women's freestyle 55 kilograms is a competition featured at the 2008 World Wrestling Championships, and was held at the Yoyogi National Gymnasium in Tokyo, Japan on 13 October.

This freestyle wrestling competition consists of a single-elimination tournament, with a repechage used to determine the winner of two bronze medals.

Results
Legend
F — Won by fall
R — Retired

Final

Top half

Bottom half

Repechage

 Anna Zwirydowska of Poland originally won the bronze medal, but was disqualified after she tested positive for doping. Brittanee Laverdure was raised to third and took the bronze medal.

References

Women's freestyle 55 kg